ToC may refer to:

 Troponin C, a protein component
 Theory of Computing, a scientific journal

See also 

 TOC (disambiguation)